Yexel Fernando Sebastian (born 12 March 1982) is a Filipino YouTuber who claims to own the 'largest Optimus Prime bust in Asia.'

Biography
Yexel Sebastian was born on 12 March 1982 to Vilmo Flores Sebastian (born August 28, 1961, Santa Cruz, Manila) and Ma. Carmen Sebastian. His younger brother was the late fellow YouTuber Jam Sebastian.

Yexel Sebastian was a former member of the dance group Black and White Street Kids at Work to Beat Machine Higher Level, Street Boys, Sop Boys and Jabbawockeez Fanatics.

Collection
His toy museum has housed his toy collection since 1989. The collection now includes over 50,000 toys and 900 life-sized statues. It is located in Las Piñas, Philippines. The four-story building exhibits miniatures to life-sized cartoon, animation, video games and movie-based characters. Its main attraction is an 18-foot Optimus Prime bust created by Abet Valdecantos. 

Sebastian's second museum, named Yexel's Toy Collection, is located inside the Boom na Boom Complex in Pasay. As of December 2014, Yexel's Toy Museum's third branch, dubbed as Amazing Stories of Yexel's Museum, in partnership with the Manila Ocean Park, was completed and introduced to the public.

He claims he currently owns 50,000 toys, and over 900 Life-size statues.

References

Living people
1982 births
Toy collectors
Filipino curators
People from Las Piñas
People from Santa Cruz, Manila